Seilala Lam (born 18 February 1989) is a rugby union player who plays as a hooker for the Samoan national rugby team and USA Perpignan.

Seilala was born in New Zealand, but emigrated with his family to Australia at the age of 11.

Career
He began his professional career in 2010, where he played with Randwick in The Shute Shield. He played the following season with Eastern Suburbs RUFC in The Shute Shield, During his time there he trained with the Waratahs where Head Coach at the time Michael Cheika suggested for him to change from an openside flanker into hooker before the 2014 National Rugby Championship season for the Canberra Vikings.

In 2015 Lam joined USO Nevers in France, playing 23 games for the club over 18 months before joining USA Perpignan in 2017.

International

Seilala Lam was first selected for Samoa in 2016, Later being named in Samoa's final 31 Man squad for the 2019 Rugby World Cup.

References

https://rugbynews.net.au/hard-hitting-lam-takes-a-shot-at-nrc-with-canberra-vikings/

1989 births
Living people
Samoan rugby union players
Rugby union players from Hamilton, New Zealand
Samoa international rugby union players
Rugby union hookers